Alexandru Nicu Giurgiu (born 25 September 1992 in Alba Iulia) is a Romanian footballer who plays as a defender for CS Ocna Mureș.

References

External links

Sportspeople from Alba Iulia
1992 births
Living people
Romanian footballers
Association football defenders
Romanian expatriate footballers
CSM Unirea Alba Iulia players
CS Turnu Severin players
FC Astra Giurgiu players
FC Dinamo București players
CS Sportul Snagov players
FCV Farul Constanța players
PFC Slavia Sofia players
Liga I players
Liga II players
Liga III players